Sarikhosor (Russian and Tajik: Сарихосор) is a village and jamoat in Tajikistan. It is located in Baljuvon District in Khatlon Region. The jamoat has a total population of 5,894 (2015).

Notes

References

Populated places in Khatlon Region
Jamoats of Tajikistan